The Wisconsin Department of Agriculture, Trade and Consumer Protection is a governmental agency of the U.S. state of Wisconsin responsible for regulating agriculture, trade, and commercial activity in the state. The department is administered by a secretary who is appointed by the governor and confirmed by the Senate.

The department is directed and supervised by a nine-member Board of Agriculture, Trade and Consumer Protection, who serve staggered six year terms and are appointed by the governor. Two of the board members are required to be consumer representatives, while the other seven are required to have an agricultural background.

History
In 1929, the state government merged the Department of Agriculture and the Department of Markets, and consolidated the Dairy and Food Commissioner, the State Treasury Agent, the State Supervisor of Inspectors of Illuminating Oils, and the State Humane Agent to form the Department of Agriculture and Markets. The department was overseen by three commissioners who were all appointed by the governor.

In 1939, the department was renamed the Department of Agriculture. The department was then overseen by a seven member Board of Agriculture, who were all appointed by the governor and confirmed by the state Senate. All seven members were required to have an agricultural background. This board appointed the department's Secretary.

In 1979, the department was renamed the Department of Agriculture, Trade and Consumer Protection. The law was changed so that one of the seven members on the board must be a consumer representative.

In 1995, the state legislature allowed the governor to appoint the department Secretary, and expanded the board to eight members, including two consumer representatives.

In 1997, the state legislature expanded the board to nine members, including seven members with agricultural backgrounds and two consumer representatives.

Divisions
Agricultural Development: promotes Wisconsin products and provides counseling and mediation services to farmers
Agricultural Resource Management: protects resources and public health
Animal Health: works to diagnose, prevent, and control serious animal diseases
Food Safety: regulates food production
Management Services: provides the administrative work for the department
Trade and Consumer Protection: enforces consumer protection laws

References

External links
Official website

Agriculture, Trade and Consumer Protection
Government agencies established in 1929
1929 establishments in Wisconsin